Enni Ben'en (圓爾辯圓, pinyin: Yuán'ěr Biànyuán; 1 November 1202 – 10 November 1280), also known as Shōichi Kokushi, was a Japanese Buddhist monk. He started his Buddhist training as a Tendai monk. While he was studying with Eisai, a vision of Sugawara no Michizane appeared to him in a dream and told him to go to China and study meditation. Following this vision, he met the Rinzai teacher Wuzhun Shifan in China, and studied Mahayana with him. When he returned to Japan, he founded Tōfuku-ji monastery in Kyoto, and practiced Zen as well as other types of Buddhism. His disciples included Mujū.

Enni Ben'en is the possible author of the Shoichikokushi kana hogo (Vernacular Dharma Words of the National Teacher Sacred Unity). The text is also known as the Zazen ron (Treatise on Seated Meditation). It is a brief text, composed of 24 questions and answers.

It is believed that he was the first to bring udon noodles to Japan from China.

References

Sources

 
 

1202 births
1280 deaths
Zen Buddhist monks
Japanese Buddhist clergy
People of Kamakura-period Japan
13th-century Buddhists
Rinzai Buddhists
Kamakura period Buddhist clergy